Senator Richardson may refer to:

Members of the Northern Irish Senate
Henry Richardson (politician) (1883–?), Northern Irish Senator from 1949 to 1957

Members of the United States Senate
Harry A. Richardson (1853–1928), U.S. Senator from Delaware from 1907 to 1913
William Alexander Richardson (1811–1875), U.S. Senator from Illinois from 1863 to 1865

United States state senate members
Bryant Richardson (fl. 2010s), Delaware State Senate
Elaine Richardson (politician) (born 1940), Arizona State Senate
Gary Richardson (Arizona politician) (fl. 1990s–2000s), Arizona State Senate
George Francis Richardson (1829–1912), Massachusetts State Senate
H. L. Richardson (1927–2020), California State Senate
Hamilton Richardson (1820–1906), Wisconsin State Senate
Harris S. Richardson (1887–1976), Massachusetts State Senate
Harrison Richardson (1930–2009), Maine State Senate
James Burchill Richardson (1770–1836), South Carolina
James D. Richardson (1843–1914), Tennessee State Senate
John Peter Richardson II (1801–1864), South Carolina
Mel Richardson (1928–2014), Idaho State Senate
William B. Richardson (1874–1945), Minnesota State Senate
William P. Richardson (New York politician) (1848–1923), New York State Senate